Brazilians in Turkey are one of the very small Brazilian communities outside Brazil, numbering about 1,050. The majority of Brazilians in Turkey work in embassies and/or consulates in Istanbul and Ankara, with a small number working in private companies in other metropolitan cities.

See also 
 Turkish Brazilian
 Turkey-Brazil relations
 Arab Brazilian
 Ethnic groups in Turkey

References 

Turkey
Ethnic groups in Turkey